Antonio Bruna (14 February 1895 – 25 December 1976) was an Italian professional footballer who played as a defender.

Career
Bruna was born in Vercelli. He played with Juventus for 6 seasons. Bruna made his debut for the Italy national football team on 13 May 1920 in a game against Netherlands. He represented Italy at the 1920 Summer Olympics and at the 1924 Summer Olympics.

References

External links
 
 

1895 births
1976 deaths
People from Vercelli
Italian footballers
Juventus F.C. players
Italy international footballers
Serie A players
Olympic footballers of Italy
Footballers at the 1920 Summer Olympics
Footballers at the 1924 Summer Olympics
Association football defenders